The Tulsa Tornados were a professional soccer team from Tulsa, Oklahoma. They played for one season (1985) in the USL. The 1985 season only lasted six games as the league folded halfway through.

Established by David Fraser during the spring of 1985, the team's ownership transferred to a group led by Jimbo Elrod and Sammie Jo Cole after Fraser failed to pay the players during the pre-season USL Cup.  Brian Harvey had originally coached the team, but resigned after the team's financial weaknesses became apparent.  John Dolinsky then coached the team for its last few games. The team failed to show up for a game at Dallas, and the match was subsequently forfeited.

1985 League Cup standings

Team scoring leader

Team goalkeeping stats

1985 Roster
 Delroy Allen; 5 Apps 0 Goals
 Ricardo Alonso
 Mike Connell
 John Dolinsky
 Winston DuBose
 Däniel Johansson; 6 Apps 3 Goals
 Peter Knezic
 Art Kramer
 Jim Millinder
 Neil Ridgeway
 Bill Sautter
 Steve Sharp
 Don Tobin
 Tim Tyma
 Thompson Usiyan
 Scott Westbrook
 Zequinha; 4 Apps 1 Goal

References

External links
1985 USL season.

United Soccer League (1984–85) teams
Defunct soccer clubs in Oklahoma
1985 establishments in Oklahoma
1985 disestablishments in Oklahoma
Soccer clubs in Oklahoma